Hawthorne, CA, subtitled Birthplace of a Musical Legacy, is the second anthology collection by The Beach Boys and released through Capitol Records. A double-compact disc, it was put together after the positive reaction to the Endless Harmony Soundtrack to give hardcore Beach Boys fans more rarities and alternate versions of well-known songs. The collection features spoken word tracks from different band members recorded throughout the 1990s during production of the Endless Harmony documentary, as well as a clip from a 1969 radio show. Home recordings dating back to 1960 and a backing track from 1973's "Sail On, Sailor" were also included. It never charted in either the United States or the United Kingdom, and it is currently out of print.

Track listing

Disc one
"Mike Love Introduces 'Surfin' " – 0:48
"3701 West 119th Street, Hawthorne, California: The 'Surfin' Rehearsal (Brian Wilson, Mike Love) – 2:40
"Happy Birthday Four Freshman" (unknown) – 0:56
"Mike On Brian's Harmonies" – 0:45
"Their Hearts Were Full of Spring" (Bobby Troup) – 2:31
 Live rehearsal for Hawaii performance, 25 August 1967
"Surfin' U.S.A." (demo) (Brian Wilson, Chuck Berry) – 2:03
"Surfin' U.S.A." (Backing track) (Brian Wilson/Chuck Berry) – 2:35
"Carl Wilson Radio Promo" – 0:15
"Shut Down" (live) (Brian Wilson, Roger Christian) – 1:56
 Recorded in Chicago on 26 March 1965 with Brian Wilson
"Little Deuce Coupe" (demo) (Brian Wilson, Roger Christian) – 1:51
"Murry Wilson Directs A Radio Promo" – 0:25
"Fun, Fun, Fun" (backing track) (Brian Wilson, Mike Love) – 2:26
"Brian's Message to 'Rog' - Take 22" – 0:29
"Dance, Dance, Dance" (stereo remix) (Brian Wilson, Carl Wilson, Mike Love) – 2:05
"Kiss Me, Baby" (a cappella mix) (Brian Wilson, Mike Love) - 2:50
"Good to My Baby" (backing track) (Brian Wilson, Mike Love) – 2:32
"Chuck Britz On Brian In The Studio" – 0:21
"Salt Lake City" (session highlights) (Brian Wilson, Mike Love) – 1:49
"Salt Lake City" (stereo remix) (Brian Wilson, Mike Love) – 2:08
"Wish That He Could Stay" (session excerpt) (Brian Wilson, Mike Love) – 1:12
"And Your Dream Comes True" (stereo remix) (Brian Wilson, Mike Love) – 1:06
"Carol K Session Highlights" – 2:12
"The Little Girl I Once Knew" (alternate version) (Brian Wilson) – 2:33
"Alan and Dennis Introduce 'Barbara Ann' " – 0:29
"Barbara Ann" (session excerpt) (Fred Fassert) – 2:52
"Barbara Ann" (master take without Party overdubs) (Fred Fassert) – 3:08
"Mike On The Everly Brothers" – 0:22
"Devoted to You" (master take without Party overdubs) (Felice and Boudleaux Bryant) – 2:19
"Dennis Thanks Everybody/In the Back of My Mind" (Brian Wilson, Mike Love) – 2:25
 Includes a hidden excerpt of The Beach Boys singing a brief tribute to KFWB radio station in concert

Disc two
"Can't Wait Too Long" (a cappella mix) (Brian Wilson) – 0:50
"Dennis Introduces Carl" – 0:43
"Good Vibrations" (stereo track sections) (Brian Wilson, Mike Love) – 3:13
"Good Vibrations" (concert rehearsal) (Brian Wilson, Mike Love) – 4:09
 Recorded in Hawaii on 25 August 1967
"Heroes and Villains" (stereo single version) (Brian Wilson, Van Dyke Parks) – 3:40
"Vegetables" (promo - instrumental section) (Brian Wilson, Van Dyke Parks) – 0:56
"Vegetables" (stereo extended mix) (Brian Wilson, Van Dyke Parks) – 3:01
"You're with Me Tonight" (Brian Wilson) – 0:49
"Lonely Days" (unknown) – 0:49
"Bruce on Wild Honey" – 0:14
"Let the Wind Blow" (stereo remix) (Brian Wilson, Mike Love) – 2:35
"I Went to Sleep" (a cappella mix) (Brian Wilson, Carl Wilson) – 1:35
"Time to Get Alone" (alternate version) (Brian Wilson) – 3:39
"Alan And Brian Talk About Dennis" – 0:19
"A Time to Live in Dreams" (Dennis Wilson, Stephen Kalinich) – 1:50
"Be with Me" (backing track) (Dennis Wilson) – 3:17
"Dennis Introduces 'Cotton Fields' " – 0:10
"Cottonfields (The Cotton Song)" (stereo single version) (Huddie Ledbetter) – 3:15
"Alan And Carl on 'Break Away' " – 0:21
"Break Away" (alternate version) (Brian Wilson, Reggie Dunbar) – 3:12
 "Reggie Dunbar" is a pseudonym for Murry Wilson
"Add Some Music to Your Day" (a cappella mix) (Brian Wilson, Mike Love, Joe Knott) – 3:29
"Dennis Wilson" – 0:27
"Forever" (a cappella mix) (Dennis Wilson, Gregg Jakobson) – 2:51
"Sail On, Sailor" (backing track) (Brian Wilson, Van Dyke Parks, Tandyn Almer, Raymond Louis Kennedy, Jack Rieley) – 3:16
"Old Man River" (vocal section) (Jerome Kern, Oscar Hammerstein II) – 1:20
"Carl Wilson" – 0:39
"The Lord's Prayer" (stereo remix) (Albert Hay Malotte) – 2:33
"Carl Wilson - Coda" – 2:28
 Includes a hidden excerpt of background vocals from "Heroes and Villains"

References

 Hawthorne, CA CD booklet notes, Alan Boyd, c. 2001

2001 compilation albums
The Beach Boys compilation albums
Capitol Records compilation albums
Albums produced by Mark Linett
Compilation albums published posthumously